Baldpate Mountain is a peak in the New York–New Jersey Highlands of the Reading Prong of Upper Pohatcong Mountain in Warren County, New Jersey, United States.

In fiction
It was the setting of the 1913 novel Seven Keys to Baldpate, which was adapted into a play and several films.

It was also a key location in the slenderverse ARG web-series EverymanHYBRID.

References

Mountains of Warren County, New Jersey
Mansfield Township, Warren County, New Jersey
Mountains of New Jersey